The Pamissos Messini Gymnastic Football Club is a football (soccer) club in Messini, Greece currently competing in Gamma Ethniki.

History

The club was founded in 1929 in Messini in Messinia and took the name from the Pamisos River which flows in the city.  Its colors are green and white and its emblem is a flower.

In the entire direction, Pamissos played a championship role in the MFCA games and took part several times in the local championships and the Messinia Cup three times.

The team played for two seasons in the Third Division 1997-98 and 2004–05 and most times in the Fourth Division.

In 1969, the team made it into the Second Division and in the match tied with Panileiakos 1-2.

Achievements
Messenian Championship: 1969, 2008, 2020
Messinia Cup (3):
1986, 1994, 1996 , 2011

Association football clubs established in 1929
Football clubs in Peloponnese (region)
1929 establishments in Greece